Alice Moore Hubbard (June 7, 1861 – May 7, 1915) was a noted American feminist, writer, and, with her husband, Elbert Hubbard was a leading figure in the Roycroft movement – a branch of the Arts and Crafts Movement in England with which it was contemporary. Moore Hubbard served as the general manager for the collective, along with managing the Roycraft Inn. She was also the principal of Roycroft School for Boys.

Born Alice Luann Moore in Wales, New York to Welcome Moore and Melinda Bush1, she was a schoolteacher before meeting her future husband, the married soap salesman and philosopher Elbert Hubbard whom she married in 1904 after a controversial affair in which she bore an illegitimate child, Miriam Elberta Hubbard (1894–1985).

On March 3, 1913, Hubbard marched in the first Washington, D.C. suffragist parade.

The couple perished in the sinking of the RMS Lusitania during the First World War while on a voyage to Europe to cover the war and ultimately interview Kaiser Wilhelm II of Germany.

Selected works
 Justinian and Theodora, 1906; with Elbert Hubbard
 Woman's Work, 1908
 Life Lessons, 1909
 The Basis of Marriage, 1910, includes an interview with Hubbard by Sophie Irene Loeb
 The Myth in Marriage, 1912

See also

Bertha Crawford Hubbard
East Aurora, New York

References

External links

 
 
 
 Alice Hubbard's biography at The Lusitania Resource1

1861 births
1915 deaths
American art
American women's rights activists
Arts and Crafts movement
Emerson College alumni
Deaths on the RMS Lusitania
Writers from New York (state)
People from Wales, New York
American suffragists